Anbe Un Vasam is a 2003 Indian Tamil-language romantic drama film directed by R. Balu. The film stars newcomer Ashwin, Rathi Arumugam and newcomer Yogan, with Karunas, Raghuvaran, Meera Krishnan, Pallavi, Vinu Chakravarthy, Pandu, Madhan Bob, and Manobala, among others, playing supporting roles. It was released on 5 December 2003.

Plot
Ashwin (Ashwin), who is from Ooty, moves to Chennai to join college in the final year. After a not-so-pleasant initial meeting, Ashwin slowly falls in love with his college mate Bharathi (Rathi Arumugam). She later understands his true love and reciprocates. After completing their studies, they meet in a temple. Ashwin fears that they might get separated and asks Bharathi to marry him right away at the registrar office, but Bharathi, who is a practical girl, has other plans. She wants Ashwin to find a job, and then she would marry him with the consent of her family. Ashwin cannot trust her since he had witnessed many lovers getting separated during their college year. An offended Bharathi scolds him for his lack of trust in her and runs away in hurt and anger. Ashwin goes back to Ooty, while Bharathi and her family relocate to Coimbatore.

Two years later, at the alumni reunion, Ashwin meets his old friends and Bharathi along with Ashok (Yogan), a family friend. Ashok tells Ashwin that he will soon marry Bharathi. Later that evening, Bharathi said to Ashwin that she was not aware of it. She then swears that she will definitely marry him and apologizes to him for running away that day. When she came home, her parents reveal that they have found a groom for her: Ashok. She convinces her parents about their marriage. Thereafter, Ashwin finds a government job in Coonoor. Ashwin and Bharathi then desperately try to contact each other; thus, Bharathi decides to go to his workplace. When she arrives at Coonoor, heavy rain was occurring over the hills, and it triggered landslides that swept aside everything in its path. Ashwin's office collapsed in front of Bharathi; in shock, she passed out. Many hours later, the rescue personnel found Bharathi and Ashwin. Ashwin survived, whereas Bharathi died of her wounds.

Cast

Ashwin as Ashwin
Rathi Arumugam as Bharathi
Yogan as Ashok
Karunas as JK
Raghuvaran as V. Rathinavel Pandian
Meera Krishnan as Jaishree, Bharathi's mother
Pallavi as Ashwin's mother
Vinu Chakravarthy as MP
Anu Mohan as College Chairman
Vennira Aadai Moorthy as Professor Kalivaradhan
Pandu as Professor
Madhan Bob as Professor
Manobala as Professor
Hemalatha as Hema, Ashwin's sister
Vinayak Raj as Mathi, Bharathi's brother
Vaiyapuri as Hussain
Kottachi as Student
Loose Mohan
K. Sivasankar
Lavanya
Shobana as Shoba
Poochi Senthil as Napoleon
Saathappan Nandakumar
Prem Menon
Valli Rajan
Sorna
Rajmohan
Sarath Chandra
Kovai Senthil
Pandiyan in a guest appearance
Chaams as College Student (uncredited)

Production
R. Balu who directed romantic films such as Kaalamellam Kadhal Vaazhga (1997) and Unnudan (1998) launched the new face Ashwin as the hero in Anbe Un Vasam. Before coming to films, Ashwin had learnt filmy dance and stunt apart from taking up the acting course from Film Institute. Rathi Arumugam signed to play the female lead role while the producer's son was introduced as a second hero. Dhina was signed on to compose the film's soundtrack and Abdul Rahman's was chosen to handle the camera. Two songs were picturised in Mauritius and the film producer stated, "We were given full police protection from Mauritius Government and also The Film Development Corporation of Mauritius were very helpful".

Soundtrack

The film score and the soundtrack were composed by Dhina.

Reception
Balaji Balasubramaniam of bbthots.com wrote, "Badly defined characters behaving in impractical ways, ridiculous situations and a silly, miscalculated ending are just some of the things wrong here". Another reviewer criticized the film's plot holes and the poor acting of Ashwin and he added that the only saving grace of the film was Rathi.

References

2003 films
2000s Tamil-language films
2003 romantic drama films
Indian romantic drama films
Films shot in Mauritius